Mary Wright may refer to:

Mary Allen Wright (1868–1948), American politician in Idaho
Mary C. Wright (1917–1970), American historian of China
Mary Kathryn Wright (born 1935), American golfer
Mary Louise Wright (1923–2004), American figure skater
Mary Wright (designer) (1904–1952), American designer, author and business person
Mary Tappan Wright (1851–1916), American novelist and short story writer
Mary Wright (gymnast) (born 1908), American Olympic gymnast
Mary J. Wright, Canadian psychologist
Mary Wright (True Blood), character in 2013 drama series

See also
Mary Wright Sewell (1797–1884), British writer
Mary Ann Wright (disambiguation)